The 1942 Northeastern Huskies football team represented Northeastern University during the 1942 college football season. It was the program's 10th season and they finished with a winless record of 0–5–1 (0–1 in New England Conference play). Their head coach was Foxy Flumere serving in his first (and only) season, and their captain was Richard Grey.

Schedule

References

Northeastern
Northeastern Huskies football seasons
College football winless seasons
Northeastern Huskies football